"", or "" ("Made of Hundreds of Flowers"), is the national anthem of Nepal. It was officially adopted as the anthem on 3 August 2007 during a ceremony held at the conference hall of National Planning Commission, inside Singha Durbar, by the speaker of the interim parliament, Subash Chandra Nembang. The previous Nepalese national anthem, "Shreeman Gambhir", had been adopted in 1962 but was dropped following the treaty of the monarchy.

The lyrics of the national anthem were penned by the poet Pradeep Kumar Rai, alias Byakul Maila. The music was composed by the late Amber Gurung. The national anthem is simply worded, praising Nepalese sovereignty, unity, courage, pride, scenic beauty, progress, peace, cultural and biological diversity and respect. In August 2016, the BBC ranked Nepal's national anthem third in its list of Rio 2016: The most amazing national anthems, citing its musical differences compared to other anthems.

Lyrics

Loose explanation 
The following explanation is meant for capturing the true essence of the national anthem:

History 
After the unanimous decision on 19 May 2006 by the interim House of Representatives of the Kingdom of Nepal, the old national anthem was discontinued. On 30 November 2006, the National Anthem Selection Task Team selected poet Byakul Maila's song as the new national anthem of the country. The new national anthem was selected from a total of 1,272 submissions made from across the country. It was officially approved on 20 April 2007.

On 3 August 2007, "Sayaun Thunga Phulka" was officially declared as Nepal's national anthem by the House of Representatives.

The anthem's range is of an octave; having a nadir and apex of D.

Protocol 
The public performance of the anthem is regulated by the law. All citizens must stand and show respect to the flag while radio and television stations shall broadcast the anthem during "startup" and "closedown".

Controversy 
During the selection process, Byakul Maila was required to prove he was not a royalist and encountered difficulties when it was discovered that he had once edited a book of poetry that contained a contribution from King Gyanendra.

Some of Nepal's Maoist leaders preferred a stronger, more revolutionary anthem akin to the communist "Internationale", and even took their own CDs into the final selection meeting hoping to overturn Byakul Maila's and Amber Gurung's effort.

See also 
 "Shreeman Gambhir", the national anthem of the Kingdom of Nepal

Notes

References

External links 
 BBC News has articles in English and Nepali about the new anthem, with a full vocal recording in the latter version.
National Anthem of Nepal (archive link)

National anthems
Nepalese songs
National symbols of Nepal
Asian anthems
National anthem compositions in G minor
2007 establishments in Nepal
Nepali-language songs